Scathophaga crinita is a species of dung fly in the family Scathophagidae.

References

Further reading

 Arnett, Ross H. (2000). American Insects: A Handbook of the Insects of America North of Mexico. CRC Press.

External links

 Diptera.info

Scathophagidae
Insects described in 1901
Taxa named by Daniel William Coquillett